Quercus repanda is a species of oak endemic to the mountains of central Mexico.

Description
Quercus repanda is a small deciduous or semi-evergreen shrub, which grows 0.2 to 1.5 meters high.

Range and habitat
Quercus repanda is native to the southern Sierra Madre Oriental, the Trans-Mexican Volcanic Belt, the northernmost Sierra Madre de Oaxaca, and several isolated ranges on the Mexican Plateau in the states of Aguascalientes, Guanajuato, Hidalgo, Michoacán, Puebla, Queretaro, San Luis Potosi, and Veracruz.

Quercus repanda is found in pine forests, pine–oak forests, oak forests, and arid scrubland, where it forms large patches. Its elevational range extends from 1,700 to 2,800 meters, and possibly from 1,100 to 3,140 meters. It is associated with species of pine, Agave, Arbutus, Baccharis, Cupressus, and Opuntia, and the oaks Quercus depressa, Quercus eduardi, Quercus laurina, and Quercus mexicana.

References

repanda
Endemic oaks of Mexico
Flora of the Sierra Madre Oriental
Flora of the Sierra Madre de Oaxaca
Flora of the Trans-Mexican Volcanic Belt
Plants described in 1809
Taxa named by Aimé Bonpland
Flora of the Mexican Plateau